William Thompson was an American professional basketball player. He played in the National Basketball League during the 1941–42 season and averaged 3.7 points per game.

References 

American men's basketball players
Basketball players from Ohio
Forwards (basketball)
Guards (basketball)
Sportspeople from Toledo, Ohio
Toledo Jim White Chevrolets players